The Harrogate and District Football League is a football competition based in North Yorkshire, England. It now has a total of two divisions, the highest of which, the Premier Division, sits at level 14 of the English football league system. It is a feeder to the West Yorkshire League..

Champions

Member clubs 2022–23

Premier Division
Bardsey
Beckwithshaw Saints
Bramhope AFC
Hampsthwaite FC
Harlow Hill
Harrogate Old Boys
Kirkstall Crusaders
Knaresborough Celtic
Ripon City Reserves
Ventus/Yeadon Celtic

Division One
Bardsey Reserves
Beckwithshaw Saints Reserves
Bedale AFC Reserves
Boroughbridge Development
Burley Trojans
Dalton Athletic
Harlow Hill Reserves
Horsforth St. Margarets D
Pannal Sports

External links
League Information at TheFA.com

 
Sport in Harrogate
Football leagues in England
Football in North Yorkshire